"99 Times" is the second official single from singer-songwriter Kate Voegele's second studio album, A Fine Mess.

Music video
The music video starts with Voegele lying in bed, listening to the song on headphones. She is also playing the song with her band. Then she starts to sing to many men, including Derek Hough, who do not respond. She also takes off various articles of clothing that the men wear, including hats and scarves. At the end, she kisses Hough and then knocks him down, causing him to knock the others down like dominoes, and they form a 99.

Track listing
Digital download
 "99 Times" – 3:28

Charts

References

2009 singles
American pop songs
2009 songs
Interscope Records singles
Song recordings produced by Mike Elizondo